Two Solitudes is a 1978 Canadian drama film written and directed by Lionel Chetwynd.

An adaptation of the 1945 novel by Hugh MacLennan, the film depicts French-English relations in Quebec during World War I and 1919 through the story of Jean-Claude Tallard (Jean-Pierre Aumont), a Member of Parliament who tries to pursue economic development opportunities for his impoverished rural area in conjunction with the wealthy Montreal industrialist Huntley McQueen (Stacy Keach) against the backdrop of the deep lingering mistrust between English Canadians and French Canadians in the aftermath of the Conscription Crisis of 1917.

The film was marketed around the theme that it would provide Canadians with insight into the victory of the Parti québécois in the 1976 Quebec general election and thus preserve national unity in the forthcoming 1980 Quebec referendum. However, the film was criticized for casting French and American, rather than Canadian, actors in its two lead roles. Aumont, in particular, was criticized for not even attempting a Québécois accent and thus sounding out of place in the film.

Music for the film was composed by Maurice Jarre, his first and only work for a Canadian film.

Cast
Jean-Pierre Aumont as Jean-Claude Tallard
Stacy Keach as Huntley McQueen
Gloria Carlin as Kathleen Tallard
Chris Wiggins as Captain Yardley
Claude Jutra as Father Beaubien
Raymond Cloutier as Marius Tallard
Jean-Louis Roux as Cardinal
Louis Negin
Murray Westgate as the Prime Minister of Canada

References

External links

1978 films
1978 drama films
1970s Canadian films
1970s English-language films
1970s political drama films
Canadian political drama films
English-language Canadian films
Films based on Canadian novels
Films scored by Maurice Jarre
Films set in Quebec